The statue of Saint Joseph with a young Jesus is an outdoor sculpture by Josef Max, installed on the south side of the Charles Bridge in Prague, Czech Republic.

External links

 

Christian sculptures
Monuments and memorials in Prague
Sculptures of men in Prague
Sculptures of Saint Joseph
Statues of Jesus
Statues on the Charles Bridge